Mehul Chinubhai Choksi (born 5 May 1959) is a fugitive Indian-born businessman living in Antigua and Barbuda, who is wanted by the Indian judicial authorities for criminal conspiracy, criminal breach of trust, cheating and dishonesty including delivery of property, corruption and money laundering. In an interview, Choksi claimed that he is innocent and all allegations against him are false, baseless and motivated by political expediency. Choksi holds Antiguan citizenship since 2017. He is the owner of Gitanjali Group, a retail jewellery company with 4,000 stores in India. An arrest warrant for Choksi has been issued in connection with the alleged Punjab National Bank fraud case. He was allegedly involved in stock market manipulation in 2013. In late May 2021, he went missing from Antigua and Barbuda. Choksi claims that he was kidnapped from Antigua by agents of the Indian state, while others stated that he fled the country. After being found and arrested in Dominica under charges of illegal entry he was then returned to Antigua and Barbuda on interim bail for medical treatment. In May 2022 the charge of illegal entry was dropped by the Dominican Government. Investigations into his disappearance are ongoing.

Early life
Mehul Choksi was born on 5 May 1959 in Bombay, the son of Chinubhai Choksi. He was educated at G. D. Modi College in Palanpur, Gujarat. He has three children, a son and two daughters. One of his daughters married Akash Mehta, an Antwerp-based diamond merchant in December 2010. Choksi is the maternal uncle of fugitive businessman Nirav Modi.

His younger brother Chetan Chinubhai Choksi owned and operated a diamond company named Diminco NV, based in Antwerp, which had defaulted on a US$25.8 million payment to a subsidiary of ICICI Bank. In 2013, the bank litigated a lawsuit against Diminco NV, in commercial courts in Belgium and UK.

Career
Choksi started his career in the gem and jewellery sector in 1975, and took over the leadership of Gitanjali Gems from his father in 1985, when it was focused on just rough and polished diamonds. He owns Gitanjali Group, which includes Gitanjali Gems.

Punjab National Bank (PNB) fraud case
In March 2018, a special PMLA court issued non-bailable arrest warrants (NBWs) against Choksi, and his nephews Nirav Modi and Neeshal Deepak Modi, owner of Firestar Diamonds. They are suspected of colluding with two employees of Punjab National Bank (PNB), the country's second-largest state-owned lender, in an alleged $1.8 billion fraud. At least six PNB staff and at least six employees of Choksi and Modi have been arrested so far. Choksi is a fugitive of Indian government. Choksi has protested his innocence in an open letter. On 6 March 2018, the CBI detained Vipul Chitalia, the Vice-President of Gitanjali Group of Companies and a key aide of Choksi. Chitalia was arrested at Mumbai airport and remained in custody till March 2018. A designated PMLA authority held that 41 properties worth about Rs 1,210 crore, attached by the Enforcement Directorate (ED) in the name of Mehul Choksi and his associated firms, are money laundering assets and ordered that their attachment should continue. The central probe agency provisionally attached 15 flats and 17 office premises in Mumbai, a mall in Kolkata, a four-acre farm house in Alibaug and 231 acres of land at locations like Nashik, Nagpur, Panvel in Maharashtra and Villupuram in Tamil Nadu, in February 2018 under the Prevention of Money Laundering Act (PMLA) in connection with the about US$2 billion alleged fraud at a Mumbai-based branch of the Punjab National Bank (PNB).

On 7 January 2018, Choksi left India to the Caribbean nation of Antigua and Barbuda. A few days later, the PNB scam was disclosed. On 15 January, he took the oath of citizenship of Antigua and Barbuda, where he applied for the citizenship in November 2017 under the country's Citizenship by Investment program. However, Indian authorities argue that he has not renounced his Indian citizenship. On 17 June, his lawyer informed the Bombay High Court that he left India for medical check-up and not to avoid prosecution in the case. Ever since, CBI has been trying to extradite him back to India.

On 23 May 2021, Choksi went missing in Antigua and Barbuda. He was last seen around 5:15 pm on 23 May before leaving his home in a car which has been recovered by the police in Jolly Harbour area. A probe was launched to look for him. It was reported that he may have fled to Cuba. On 26 May, he was found in a nearby Caribbean country of Dominica while trying to flee to Cuba by a boat and was held by the local police. This flee attempt would make CBI's case of extraditing him to India in Antiguan courts stronger. His lawyer claimed that Choksi was kidnapped by whom Choksi believed to be Indian and Antiguan police and brought to Dominica by a boat. He also claimed that Choksi had a swollen eye and several bruises when he met Choksi. Dominica brought a case against Choksi for illegal entry into the country, but this was dropped in May 2022.

On 29 May 2021, Choksi's pictures were surfaced by Antiguan media. In the pictures, Choksi sustained several injuries to his left hand and the left eye is bruised and swollen. Several Indian agencies were in touch with the Dominican government using diplomatic channels urging that he is an Indian citizen and that he had an Interpol Red Corner notice and he should be handed over to the Indian authorities. The opposition parties United Workers' Party of Dominica and United Progressive Party of Antigua and Barbuda are allegedly utilising this opportunity to support him against his deportation to India, in return for campaign funding.

In early June 2021, Choksi filed an affidavit in the High Court of Dominica claiming there was no arrest warrant against him when he left India in January 2018 seeking medical treatment in the USA. He also stated that he has no intentions of absconding from attending the court and that he doesn't intend to leave Dominica. He claimed medical issues and fear for his health in his bail petition. Antiguan Information Minister Melford Nicholas stated that they moved to rescind his Antiguan citizenship on the basis that he provided false information while applying for the citizenship. Choksi has challenged it in the court.

In December 2022 the Royal Police Force of Antigua and Barbuda announced that they were working with other police forces both in the Carribean and internationally regarding the matter of Choksi's disappearance. In January 2023, Antiguan authorities announced that they had secured Interpol Red Notices against three individuals suspected of kidnapping Choksi. In March, Choksi won a court victory in Antigua preventing the Attorney General of Antigua and Barbuda from striking out his claim that there was a constitutional violation arising from the failure to adequately investigate his claims of being victim of inhuman treatment and torture.

See also
 List of fugitives from justice who disappeared

References

Living people
Businesspeople from Mumbai
1959 births
Gujarati people
Fugitives wanted by India
Indian fraudsters
Gitanjali Group